Frederick Barter VC MC (17 January 1891 – 15 May 1952) was a Welsh recipient of the Victoria Cross, the highest and most prestigious award for gallantry in the face of the enemy that can be awarded to British and Commonwealth forces.

He was born in Cardiff. He was 24 years old, and a company sergeant-major in the Special Reserve, The Royal Welch Fusiliers, British Army, attached to the 1st Battalion, The Royal Welch Fusiliers during the First World War when the following deed took place for which he was awarded the VC.

On 16 May 1915 at Festubert, France, Company Sergeant-Major Barter, when in the first line of German trenches, called for volunteers to enable him to extend our line, and with the eight men who responded, he attacked the German position with bombs, capturing three German officers, 102 men and 500 yards of their trenches. He subsequently found and cut 11 of the enemy's mine leads situated about 20 yards apart.

He was commissioned a Second Lieutenant in the Special Reserve, The Royal Welch Fusiliers, 26 August 1915.

On 16 March 1917 he was seconded on probation with the Indian Army and was attached to the 4th battalion 3rd Queen Alexandra's Own Gurkha Rifles, with seniority as a Second Lieutenant of 26 May 1916. He was promoted Lieutenant 26 May 1917. He was awarded the Military Cross in the London Gazette 26 July 1918.

The citation is as follows:

"For conspicuous gallantry and devotion to duty when ordered to make a flank attack.
He led his two platoons up a precipitous hill and turned the enemy's flank. Then,
placing one platoon with two Lewis guns to command the enemy's line of retreat, he
gallantly led an attack with the other platoon from the rear and flank, killing or
capturing practically the whole garrison."

He was admitted to the Indian Army on 6 May 1918, promoted captain on 26 May 1920 and retired from the Indian Army on 5 November 1922.

His Victoria Cross is displayed at the Royal Welch Fusiliers Museum at Caernarfon Castle.

References

Monuments to Courage (David Harvey, 1999)
The Register of the Victoria Cross (This England, 1997)
VCs of the First World War - The Western Front 1915 (Peter F. Batchelor & Christopher Matson, 1999)

External links
Burial location of Frederick Barter "Dorset"
Location of Frederick Barter's Victoria Cross "Royal Welch Fusiliers Museum"

1891 births
1952 deaths
Military personnel from Cardiff
British Army personnel of World War I
Indian Army personnel of World War I
British World War I recipients of the Victoria Cross
Royal Welch Fusiliers soldiers
Royal Welch Fusiliers officers
Recipients of the Military Cross
British Indian Army officers
Welsh military personnel
Recipients of the Cross of St. George
British Army recipients of the Victoria Cross
Welsh recipients of the Victoria Cross